Eucalyptus confluens, commonly known as Kimberley gum, is a species of small tree that is endemic to northern Australia. It has smooth, powdery white bark, lance-shaped adult leaves, more or less spherical flower buds in groups of seven, white flowers and cup-shaped to hemispherical fruit. It grows in the Kimberley region of Western Australia and in adjacent areas of the Northern Territory.

Description
It has smooth, powdery, white over pale pink bark throughout. Flowering occurs between February and March and the flowers are white.

Taxonomy and naming
Eucalyptus confluens was first formally described in 1916 by Joseph Maiden from an incomplete description by William Vincent Fitzgerald. The specific epithet (confluens) is a Latin word meaning "place where two streams meet", referring to the arrangement of the leaf veins.

Eucalyptus confluens is similar in appearance two other white gums within its area of occurrence, E. brevifolia and E. gregoriensis.

Distribution and habitat
Kimberley gum is found in two disjunct populations in the Kimberley region of Western Australia and adjacent areas of the Northern Territory. One population grows on the Wunaamin Miliwundi Ranges and the other in the Lake Argyle area on the Western Australia-Northern Territory border. It is often found on rocky hillsides or ridges growing in sandy stony soils over sandstone, granite or quartzite.

See also
List of Eucalyptus species

References

Eucalypts of Western Australia
Flora of the Northern Territory
Trees of Australia
confluens
Myrtales of Australia
Plants described in 1916
Taxa named by William Vincent Fitzgerald